Dying Sentiment is the first demo released by the death metal band The Mandrake. The album shows bits and pieces of the black metal style of music. It was released in 2001.

Track listing
Summon The Krakken
Circles Of Fire
Night Of Day
Here To Eternity
Malevolent Garden
Outro Terminar

References

External links
SSMT Review
Homepage
Encyclopaedia Metallum

The Mandrake (band) albums